Eelco Sintnicolaas (born 7 April 1987, in  Dordrecht) is a Dutch track and field athlete, specialising in the decathlon.

His personal best in the decathlon is a score of 8.052 points at the Götzis Meeting in 2009. That same year he earned a gold medal at the U23 European Championships, with 8.112 points, whereas his best result was a silver medal at the 2010 European Championships in Athletics in Barcelona with 8.436 points. At the Götzis Meeting in 2012 he finished second with personal best result 8506 pts.

He cleared 8000 points at the 2013 Decastar meeting, taking third place with a total of 8018.

International competitions

Personal bests

Outdoor
100 metres – 10.57 (Götzis 2017)
200 metres – 22.27 (+0.3 m/s, Apeldoorn 2008)
400 metres – 47.88 (Barcelona 2010)
1500 metres – 4:22.29 (Götzis 2011)
110 metres hurdles – 13.92 (+0.9 m/s, Nottwil 2013)
High jump – 2.02 (Moscow 2013)
Pole vault – 5.45 (Barcelona 2010)
Long jump – 7.65 (+0.8 m/s, Moscow 2013)
Shot put – 14.67 (Götzis 2015)
Discus throw – 43.52 (Götzis 2017)
Javelin throw – 63.59 (Götzis 2012)
Decathlon – 8.532 (Götzis 2017) NR

Indoor
60 metres – 6.88 (Gothenburg 2013)
1000 metres – 2:38.73 (Gothenburg 2013)
60 metres hurdles – 7.88 (Apeldoorn 2013)
High jump – 2.08 (Apeldoorn 2013)
Pole vault – 5.52 (Apeldoorn 2011)
Long jump – 7.65 (Ghent 2007)
Shot put – 14.86 (Apeldoorn 2016)
Heptathlon – 6372 (Gothenburg 2013) NR

References

External links

1987 births
Living people
Dutch decathletes
Sportspeople from Dordrecht
Athletes (track and field) at the 2012 Summer Olympics
Athletes (track and field) at the 2016 Summer Olympics
Olympic athletes of the Netherlands
European Athletics Championships medalists
World Athletics Championships athletes for the Netherlands
Dutch Athletics Championships winners
21st-century Dutch people